Newport was a borough constituency in Monmouthshire from 1918 to 1983. It returned one Member of Parliament (MP) to the House of Commons of the Parliament of the United Kingdom, elected by the first past the post system.

The constituency was created by the Representation of the People Act 1918 and abolished with the creation of the Newport East and Newport West constituencies. The Representation of the People Act enfranchised the county borough of Newport as a parliamentary borough returning one member. Previously, the borough was represented as part of the Monmouth Boroughs constituency, which also covered Monmouth and Usk.

Boundaries 
1918–1955: The County Borough of Newport.

1955–1983: As above, as extended by the Newport Corporation Act 1954.

Members of Parliament

Election results

Elections in the 1910s

Elections in the 1920s 

Clarry stood on a platform of opposition to the Coalition Government. Moore was also opposed to the Coalition and called for a reunited Liberal Party.

Elections in the 1930s

Elections in the 1940s

Elections in the 1950s

Elections in the 1960s

Elections in the 1970s

See also 
 1922 Newport by-election
 1945 Newport by-election
 1956 Newport by-election

References

Sources 
 
 Craig, F.W.S. British Parliamentary Election Results 1918-1949 (Glasgow; Political Reference Publications, 1969)

Politics of Newport, Wales
Historic parliamentary constituencies in South Wales
History of Newport, Wales
Constituencies of the Parliament of the United Kingdom established in 1918
Constituencies of the Parliament of the United Kingdom disestablished in 1983